Jeffrey Rentmeister (born 11 July 1984) is a Belgian footballer who plays for Sporting Hasselt.

Career
He signed for Blackpool on 12 August 2014 and made his first-team debut for the club the same day playing in the League Cup fixture against Shrewsbury Town. He was released in May 2015.

References

External links

1984 births
Living people
People from Oupeye
Belgian footballers
Belgian expatriate footballers
Expatriate footballers in England
Expatriate footballers in Luxembourg
Belgian Pro League players
Challenger Pro League players
English Football League players
RFC Liège players
K.A.S. Eupen players
K.S.K. Beveren players
F91 Dudelange players
C.S. Visé players
K.V.C. Westerlo players
Blackpool F.C. players
Association football defenders
Footballers from Liège Province